The 2019–20 season is Gimnasia y Esgrima's 2nd consecutive season in the second division of Argentine football. In addition to Primera B Nacional, the club are competing in the Copa Argentina.

The season generally covers the period from 1 July 2019 to 30 June 2020.

Review

Pre-season
Neri Espinosa was the first player out the door, as his move to Deportivo Maipú of Torneo Federal A was confirmed on 4 June 2019. Nine days later, Mateo Ramírez joined fellow Primera B Nacional team Guillermo Brown. Gimnasia y Esgrima announced their first incoming on 15 June as Brian Alferez was loaned from Godoy Cruz. In the subsequent five days, Gonzalo Bazán and Lucas Baldunciel departed to Platense and Temperley respectively. A third and fourth player left between 25-27 June, with Lucas Márquez and Diego Auzqui going to Mitre. Patricio Cucchi went abroad on 28 June, signing with Atlético Nacional of Categoría Primera A. Right midfielder Pablo Cortizo headed off to top-flight Patronato on 30 June. Numerous 2018–19 loans expired on/around on 30 June.

San Martín signed forward Sebastián Matos on 2 July. Their first permanent transaction was made on 4 July in Iván Ramírez from Flandria. Lucas Carrizo and Renzo Vera were revealed as new signings on 7 July. Primera División side Godoy Cruz were Gimnasia'a first opponents of pre-season, facing them on 11 July though failing to come out on top across two matches.

July
Gimnasia y Esgrima met River Plate in a round of thirty-two tie in the Copa Argentina on 16 July, they would eventually lose out on penalties after a score draw in normal time; where Renzo Vera netted, while Brian Andrada missed the decisive spot-kick. Federico Mazur arrived from Temperley on 23 July. Jacobo Mansilla made a move from Patronato on 25 July. Gimnasia lost in back-to-back friendlies with San Martín (SJ) on 27 July.

August
3 August saw Gonzalo Berterame sign from San Lorenzo. Six days later, Gimnasia met their third opponent of pre-season in Belgrano - drawing and losing, taking their overall winless streak to seven matches. On 12 August, another new player arrived from San Lorenzo as Alejandro Molina put pen to paper. Felix Orode signed from Defensores de Pronunciamiento on 13 August, while Luis Salces followed the Nigerian attacking midfielder in on 14 August. Stefano Brundo went off to Atlético de Rafaela on 12 August. Gimnasia's first fixture in Primera B Nacional ended in a goalless draw versus Defensores de Belgrano at the Estadio Víctor Antonio Legrotaglie on 18 August. Leandro Aguirre converted an early penalty to seal victory over Almagro on 25 August.

Gonzalo Marronkle debuted against Almagro, despite no official confirmation from the club regarding his arrival. Lisandro Cabrera was loaned from Newell's Old Boys on 27 August.

September
Gimnasia failed to score for the second successive home match on 2 September, as they drew 0–0 with Quilmes.

Squad

Transfers
Domestic transfer windows:3 July 2019 to 24 September 201920 January 2020 to 19 February 2020.

Transfers in

Transfers out

Loans in

Friendlies

Pre-season
Godoy Cruz of the Primera División were scheduled to be Gimnasia y Esgrima's opening opponents of pre-season. They'd also travel to the Estadio Ingeniero Hilario Sánchez to play San Martín (SJ) and to the El Gigante de Alberdi to face Belgrano.

Competitions

Primera B Nacional

Results summary

Matches
The fixtures for the 2019–20 league season were announced on 1 August 2019, with a new format of split zones being introduced. Gimnasia y Esgrima were drawn in Zone B.

Copa Argentina

River Plate, of the Primera División, were drawn to play Gimnasia y Esgrima in the Copa Argentina on 16 July, with the round of thirty-two tie scheduled for the Estadio Único in Villa Mercedes, San Luis; at a neutral stadium, as is normal in the competition.

Squad statistics

Appearances and goals

Statistics accurate as of 4 September 2019.

Goalscorers

Notes

References

Gimnasia y Esgrima de Mendoza seasons
Gimnasia y Esgrima